Pradelles is a commune in the Haute-Loire department in south-central France.

Sights
The Robert Louis Stevenson Trail (GR 70), a popular long-distance path, runs through the town, though Stevenson stayed here less than an hour during his 1878 journey, described in the book Travels with a Donkey in the Cévennes.

See also
Communes of the Haute-Loire department

References

Communes of Haute-Loire
Plus Beaux Villages de France
Vivarais